Stansberry Lake is a census-designated place located in Pierce County, Washington.

Demographics
In 2010, it had a population of 2,101 inhabitants. 1,061 are male. 1,040 are female.

Geography
Stansberry Lake is located at coordinates 47°22′58″N 122°42′43″W.

References

Census-designated places in Pierce County, Washington